The White Death (German: Der weiße Tod) is a 1921 German silent drama film directed by Adolf Gärtner and starring Ellen Richter, Eduard von Winterstein and Hans Adalbert Schlettow.

Cast 
 Ellen Richter as Die kranke Tochter 
 Eduard von Winterstein as der Vater 
 Hans Adalbert Schlettow as Der Bräutigam 
 Claire Creutz
 Gert Sascha

References

Bibliography
 Bock, Hans-Michael & Bergfelder, Tim. The Concise CineGraph. Encyclopedia of German Cinema. Berghahn Books, 2009.

External links

1921 films
Films of the Weimar Republic
Films directed by Adolf Gärtner
German silent feature films
UFA GmbH films
1921 drama films
German drama films
German black-and-white films
Silent drama films
1920s German films
1920s German-language films